Yurd-e Shad (also Romanized as Yūrd-e Shād) is a village in Siyahrud Rural District, in the Central District of Tehran County, Tehran Province, Iran. At the 2006 census, its population was 44, in 13 families.

References 

Populated places in Tehran County